= UAEM Maastricht =

Universities Allied for Essential Medicines
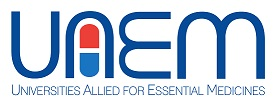
- Founded: 2014
- Purpose: accessibility to essential medicine
- Location: Maastricht, NL
- Subsidiaries: Maastricht University
- Volunteers: 35
- Website: www.uaem.org

UAEM Maastricht chapter is the first chapter in The Netherlands that succeeded in making an agreement with the university signing the Socially Responsible Research and Licensing (SRRL) policy. "Access to Medicine" is the aim of the organization with focus on the Research and Development system and shared decision making with Maastricht University to actively pursue the goals drafted in Socially Responsible Research and Licensing (SRRL) policy. UAEM Maastricht has two active taskforces namely policy and awareness.

== A2M week ==
From the 14th until 20 November 2016 UAEM Maastricht participated at the "Access to Medicines Week" that takes place once a year all around the globe. A series of awareness-raising events, including this year's notable lecture on Malaria Resistance given by Bart Knols (President of the Dutch Malaria Foundation) and movie-night screening of the documentary "Resistance", were organized to deal with the issue of Antimicrobial Resistance and the shortcomings in antibiotic research.

== Board ==
The board members of UAEM Maastricht 2017/2018 are Lize van Rooij, Mona Giesen, Xenia Leontarakis, Layal Hamie, Nadia Pacheco Blanco and Saeed Banaama
